Mattawa station is a disused Canadian Pacific Railway train station in Mattawa, Ontario, Canada.

The railroad was built to Mattawa in 1881 A railway line from Mattawa to Témiscaming, Quebec opened in 1923, 

Mattawa was located on the Canadian Pacific Railway's Chalk River subdivision, connecting Smiths Falls and North Bay. The route was later leased to Ottawa Valley Railway, and part of it was abandoned and torn up.

References

External links
 Photo of the station in 1979

Canadian Pacific Railway stations in Ontario
Mattawa, Ontario
History of rail transport in Nipissing District